Radhanagar Union is a union parishad situated at Atwari Upazila,  in Panchagarh District, Rangpur Division of Bangladesh. There are 9 villages and 9 mouzas in the union.

References

External links
 

Unions of Atwari Upazila
Unions of Panchagarh District
Unions of Rangpur Division